I've Never Loved Anyone More is a studio album by the country singer Lynn Anderson, released in 1975. In the USA, two singles were released from the album, the title song (written by Linda Hargrove and Michael Nesmith) and "He Turns It Into Love Again". The title track reached No. 14 while "He Turns It Into Love Again" reached No. 13, becoming the first time Anderson had consecutive non-top ten singles since signing with Columbia Records in 1970. She did not return to the top ten again until 1979 with "Isn't it Always Love". The album was the only Columbia studio album of Anderson's not to be released on the cassette tape format.

The album was produced by Glenn Sutton, Anderson's husband and producer at the time, and has of 11 tracks. Two cover versions included here were hits from 1975, "Faithless Love" (a J. D. Souther composition best known as performed by Linda Ronstadt) and "I'm Not Lisa" (by Jessi Colter). "I've Never Loved Anyone More" was released by Linda Hargrove in 1974, a single from her album Blue Jean Country Queen.

Critical reception
Billboard praised the title track, writing that it "shows some tenderness in [Anderson's] voice with an excellent song."

Track listing

References

1975 albums
Lynn Anderson albums
Albums produced by Glenn Sutton
Columbia Records albums